Olexander Viktorovich Bilanenko (born January 8, 1978 in Sumy) is a former Ukrainian biathlete.

He retired from the sport at the end of the 2013–14 season.

Performances

World Cup

Podiums

Positions

References

External links 
 Profile on biathlon.com.ua
 Profile and Statistics

1978 births
Living people
Sportspeople from Sumy
Ukrainian male biathletes
Biathletes at the 2002 Winter Olympics
Biathletes at the 2006 Winter Olympics
Biathletes at the 2010 Winter Olympics
Olympic biathletes of Ukraine
Biathlon World Championships medalists
Universiade medalists in biathlon
Universiade gold medalists for Ukraine
Competitors at the 2003 Winter Universiade
Competitors at the 2005 Winter Universiade